Events from the year 1980 in North Korea.

Incumbents
Premier: Li Jong-ok 
Supreme Leader: Kim Il-sung

Events
6th Congress of the Workers' Party of Korea

Born

 3 June - An Kum-ae.
 14 August - Pak Song-gwan.

See also
Years in Japan
Years in South Korea

References

 
North Korea
Years of the 20th century in North Korea
North Korea
1980s in North Korea
North